Beastly Boyz is a 2006 Canadian-American homoerotic horror television film directed by David DeCoteau. It was the first film to be released on his Rapid Heart Extreme label. The film has been screened on the LGBT-focused here! television network.

Plot
Rachel, a beautiful young artist, is murdered at her secluded lakefront house by a group of soulless killers. Her brother Travis vows to punish her killers one by one - even if it costs him his soul. Guided by his sister's ghostly voice that commands him to take brutal revenge, Travis hunts down each of the killers and punishes them in gruesome fashion. Travis's conscience catches up with him, but his sister's voice and other circumstances push him into much more horrible circumstances than he is already in.

References

External links
 

 Official Website for David Decoteau's films
 review at Extraordinary Movie & Video Guide

2006 LGBT-related films
2006 horror films
2006 television films
American LGBT-related television films
Canadian LGBT-related television films
English-language Canadian films
Films directed by David DeCoteau
LGBT-related horror films
2006 films
Gay-related films
American horror television films
Canadian horror television films
2000s American films
2000s Canadian films
2000s English-language films